This is a list of Billboard magazine's Top Hot 100 songs of 1967.

See also
1967 in music
List of Billboard Hot 100 number-one singles of 1967
List of Billboard Hot 100 top-ten singles in 1967

References

1967 record charts
Billboard charts